The Fischer Defense to the King's Gambit is a chess opening variation that begins with the moves:
1. e4 e5
2. f4 exf4
3. Nf3 d6

Although 3...d6 was previously known, it did not become a major variation until Fischer advocated it in a famous 1961 article in the first issue of the American Chess Quarterly.

In the Encyclopaedia of Chess Openings, the Fischer Defense is given the code C34.

History
After Bobby Fischer lost a 1960 game at Mar del Plata to Boris Spassky, in which Spassky played the Kieseritzky Gambit, Fischer left in tears and promptly went to work at devising a new defense to the King's Gambit. In Fischer's 1961 article, "A Bust to the King's Gambit", he claimed, "In my opinion the King's Gambit is busted. It loses by force." Fischer concluded the article with the famous line, "Of course White can always play differently, in which case he merely loses differently. (Thank you, Weaver Adams!)" The article became famous. Fischer never tested this published analysis as Black in a tournament game; he never again faced the gambit after his 1960 loss to Spassky.

Fischer himself later played the King's Gambit with some success, winning all three tournament games in which he played it. However, he played the Bishop's Gambit (1.e4 e5 2.f4 exf4 3.Bc4) rather than the King's Knight Gambit (3.Nf3), the only line that he analyzed in his article.

Ideas behind the opening

Fischer called 3...d6 "a high-class waiting move". It allows Black to hold the gambit pawn with ...g5 (unless White plays the immediate 4.h4) while avoiding the Kieseritzky Gambit (1.e4 e5 2.f4 exf4 3.Nf3 g5 4.h4 g4 5.Ne5). Fischer asserted that 3...g5 "is inexact because it gives White drawing chances" after 4.h4 g4 5.Ne5 Nf6 6.d4 d6 7.Nd3 Nxe4 8.Bxf4 Bg7 9.c3! (improving on Spassky's 9.Nc3) Qe7 10.Qe2 Bf5 11.Nd2, which, according to Fischer, "leads to an ending where Black's extra pawn is neutralized by White's stranglehold on the dark squares, especially [f4]".

After 1.e4 e5 2.f4 exf4 3.Nf3 d6 the most common response is 4.d4. If White now tries to force transpositions to Becker Defense (3...h6) or Classical Defense (3...g5) positions, then White can end up in difficulties. Fischer analyzed 4.d4 g5 5.h4 g4 6.Ng5 f6 7.Nh3 gxh3 8.Qh5+ Kd7 9.Bxf4 Qe8! 10.Qf3 Kd8 "and with King and Queen reversed, Black wins easily". Fischer claimed that White has no compensation after the alternative 6.Ng1 Bh6, however in practice White has achieved good results in this line after 7.Nc3 c6 8.Nge2 Qf6 9.g3, and Nigel Short used it to defeat Vladimir Akopian in Madrid 1997.

Another popular move is 4.Bc4. Fischer recommended 4...h6 in response, which he dubbed the "Berlin Defence Deferred". Black's third and fourth moves stop the white knight on f3 from moving to the two dangerous squares e5 and g5. This variation received a high-class examination in a game between two world champions: Boris Spassky vs. Anatoly Karpov, at Berlin TV 1982, played at a one-hour-game format in an event for West German television. GM Spassky won on time in an ending of Q + N vs Q; White had a satisfactory position from the opening. 

A quite recent idea is 4.d4 g5 5.Nc3. White intends to leave the bishop on f1 for a while, play an improved version of the Hanstein Gambit (3...g5 4.Bc4 Bg7 and later g2–g3), and, after forcing Black's f4-pawn to move, develop the queenside with Be3, Qd2, and 0-0-0.

See also
 List of chess openings
 List of chess openings named after people

References

Chess openings
1961 in chess
Bobby Fischer